Kentucky Route 1010 (KY 1010) is an  state highway in the U.S. state of Kentucky. The route traverses rural areas of eastern Wolfe and southwestern Morgan counties. KY 1010 runs from KY 1812 northwest of Malaga to U.S. Route 460 (US 460) southeast of Hazel via Lexie, Rose Chapel, Hazel Green, Toliver, and Maytown.

Major intersections

References

1010
Transportation in Morgan County, Kentucky
Transportation in Wolfe County, Kentucky